Philpots Island is a member of the Queen Elizabeth Islands and the Arctic Archipelago in the territory of Nunavut. It is the largest of Devon Island's offshore islands, located at Devon's eastern end. It lies in Baffin Bay, with Hyde Inlet to the north, and the Parry Channel to the south.

Philpots Island is home to northern fulmars, glaucous gulls, and ivory gulls

References

External links
 Philpots Island in the Atlas of Canada - Toporama; Natural Resources Canada

Islands of the Queen Elizabeth Islands
Uninhabited islands of Qikiqtaaluk Region
Islands of Baffin Bay